Max Abraham (June 3, 1831 – December 8, 1900) was a German music publisher.

Born in Danzig, Abraham became a partner in the C.F. Peters publishing house in 1863, and took over as its sole proprietor in 1880. He founded its Edition Peters, and was succeeded as head of the firm by his nephew, Henri Hinrichsen. He died in Leipzig.

References
 

1831 births
1900 deaths
German music publishers (people)
Edvard Grieg
19th-century composers